The Kerenzerberg Rail Tunnel is a rail tunnel in the Swiss canton of Glarus.

Prior to 1960, the railway used a route along the shores of the Walensee and through shorter tunnels. The trackbed of this route is now used by the westbound carriageway of the A3 motorway, with the eastbound carriageway using the Kerenzerberg Road Tunnel that runs roughly parallel to the rail tunnel.

References

Railway tunnels in Switzerland
Buildings and structures in the canton of Glarus